Events from the year 1667 in France

Incumbents
 Monarch – Louis XIV

Events
March – Louis XIV abolishes the livre parisis (Paris pound), in favor of the much more widely used livre tournois (Tours pound). He also designates Gabriel Nicolas de la Reynie as the first chief of police of Paris.
24 May – The War of Devolution begins: France invades Flanders and Franche-Comté; on 10 August the siege of Lille, the war's only main engagement, begins, ending in a French victory.
26 June – Louis XIV conquers Tournai.
31 July – The Treaty of Breda ends the Second Anglo-Dutch War and recognizes Acadia as a French possession.

Births
 
2 November – James Louis Sobieski, Prince of Poland (died 1737)

Full date missing
Nicolas Bertin, painter (died 1736)

Deaths
16 or 17 March – Philippe Labbé, Jesuit writer on historical, geographical and philological issues (born 1607)
16 May – Samuel Bochart, biblical scholar (born 1599)

See also

References

1660s in France